Potma is an urban locality (a work settlement) in Zubovo-Polyansky District of the Republic of Mordovia, Russia. As of the 2010 Census, its population was 4,171.

Administrative and municipal status
Within the framework of administrative divisions, the work settlement of Potma, together with one rural locality (the settlement of Pruzhanskoye lesnichestvo), is incorporated within Zubovo-Polyansky District as Potma Work Settlement (an administrative division of the district). As a municipal division, Potma Work Settlement is incorporated within Zubovo-Polyansky Municipal District as Potminskoye Urban Settlement.

References

Notes

Sources

Urban-type settlements in Mordovia
Zubovo-Polyansky District
